The Funeral of Phocion is a 1648 landscape painting, also known as The Burial of Phocion, Landscape with the Funeral of Phocion and Landscape with the Body of Phocion Carried out of Athens, by the French artist Nicolas Poussin. Phocion was an Athenian statesman from the 4th century BC.

Three versions of the painting are known.  These are now housed in The Louvre, Paris; National Museum Cardiff and the collections of the Glass House in New Canaan, Connecticut, United States.

In the same year Poussin painted a companion piece to The Funeral of Phocion, Landscape with the Ashes of Phocion.

References

Further reading
Paul Jamot, "Poussin's Two Pictures of the Story of Phocion" in The Burlington Magazine for Connoisseurs Vol. 40, No. 229 (April 1922), pp. 156–158

External links
 Article on the Louvre version
 Press release on the Glass House version
 Article on the two companion Phocion paintings
 Artcyclopedia article

1648 paintings
Paintings by Nicolas Poussin
Paintings in the Louvre by French artists
Paintings in the collection of National Museum Cardiff
Paintings in the collection of the Glass House
Landscape paintings
Paintings about death
Sheep in art
Horses in art